Plumas Unified School District is a public school district in Plumas County, California, United States.

References

External links
 
School districts in California